Clark E. Bronson (born 1939) is an American sculptor.

Biography 
Bronson was born in Kamas, Utah, in 1939. He attended the University of Utah, where he studied under Arnold Friberg. In 1960, he started working for the Utah Fish and Game Department, illustrating wildlife and big game. In about 1970, he abandoned painting for sculpting. Later, in the 1990s, he moved into making films of wildlife.

Collections 
 Springville Museum of Art - The Big Boys, bronze, 1984
 Fairview Museum of History & Art

Awards 
 1974 - Silver Medal, Prix de West Award, National Cowboy & Western Heritage Museum
 1975 - Silver Medal, Prix de West Award, National Cowboy & Western Heritage Museum
 1977 - Silver Medal, Prix de West Award, National Cowboy & Western Heritage Museum

References

1939 births
American male sculptors
Living people
People from Bozeman, Montana
People from Provo, Utah
People from Summit County, Utah
University of Utah alumni